Carmen McRae Sings Lover Man and Other Billie Holiday Classics is a 1962 studio album by Carmen McRae, recorded in tribute to McRae's idol, Billie Holiday, who had died two years previously.

Reception

Scott Yanow of Allmusic said that the album was one of McRae's "best recordings of the 1960s. McRae always considered Billie Holiday to be her primary influence, so a tribute album was a natural project for her...Recommended".

Track listing
"Them There Eyes" (Maceo Pinkard, Doris Tauber, William Tracey) - 2:45
"Yesterdays" (Jerome Kern, Otto Harbach) - 4:52
"I'm Gonna Lock My Heart (And Throw Away the Key)" (Jimmy Eaton, Terry Shand) - 2:32
"Strange Fruit" (Lewis Allen) - 2:47
"Miss Brown to You" (Richard A. Whiting, Ralph Rainger, Leo Robin) - 2:28
"My Man" (Maurice Yvain, Jacques Charles, Albert Willemetz, Channing Pollack) - 4:05
"I Cried for You (Now It's Your Turn to Cry Over Me)" (Gus Arnheim, Abe Lyman, Arthur Freed) - 2:52
"Lover Man (Oh, Where Can You Be?)" (Jimmy Davis, Roger "Ram" Ramirez, James Sherman) - 4:18
"Trav'lin' Light" (Trummy Young, Jimmy Mundy, Johnny Mercer) - 2:20
"Some Other Spring" (Arthur Herzog, Jr., Irene Kitchings) - 3:02
"What a Little Moonlight Can Do" (Harry Woods) - 3:31
"God Bless the Child" (Herzog, Billie Holiday) - 3:24
Bonus tracks on the 1997 CD reissue
"If the Moon Turns Green" (Bernie Hanighen, Paul Coates) - 3:28
"The Christmas Song" (Bob Wells, Mel Tormé) - 3:55

Personnel
Carmen McRae - vocals
Norman Simmons' Sextet
Eddie "Lockjaw" Davis - tenor saxophone
Nat Adderley - trumpet
Norman Simmons - piano, arranger
Mundell Lowe - guitar
Bob Cranshaw - double bass
Walter Perkins - drums
Technical
Fred Plaut - recording engineer
Henry "Hank" Parker - cover photography

References

1962 albums
Carmen McRae albums
Columbia Records albums
Billie Holiday tribute albums
Albums produced by Teo Macero
Albums produced by Carmen McRae